Bogamuwa is a village in Sri Lanka. It is located within North Western Province.

See also
List of towns in North Western Province, Sri Lanka

External links

North Western Province, Sri Lanka